INS Prema is a fuel barge built by Goa Shipyard Limited for Indian Navy.
Its yard no is 1145 and was delivered on 23/07/1988.
The vessels IMO number is 8612201 and has dead weight of 400 tonnes.

See also
 INS Pushpa

References

1988 ships
Auxiliary ships of the Indian Navy